Shlomo Nahari (born 17 October 1934) is an Israeli footballer. He played in twelve matches for the Israel national football team from 1958 to 1961.

References

External links
 

1934 births
Living people
Israeli footballers
Hapoel Ra'anana A.F.C. players
Hapoel Petah Tikva F.C. players
Israel international footballers
Liga Leumit players
1960 AFC Asian Cup players
Place of birth missing (living people)
Association footballers not categorized by position